Vercetti may refer to:

Lucas Vercetti, part of the American hip hop collective Odd Future or OFWGKTA (Odd Future Wolf Gang Kill Them All)
Tommy Vercetti, a fictional character, the protagonist and playable character in the 2002 video game Grand Theft Auto: Vice City